Reck or Rek is a surname of German origin.

People with the surname 
 Friedrich Reck (1884-1945), German author and opponent of Nazism
 John Reck (1865–1951), American politician
 Hans Reck (1886–1937), German volcanologist and paleontologist
 Paulette Reck (born  1948), American model
 Stefan Reck (born 1954), German television actor
 Centa Rek (born 1954), Bolivian politician
 Cervantes Reck (born 1963), American theater and film actor
 Oliver Reck (born 1965), German football goalkeeper
 Sean Reck (born 1967), English former footballer
 Lars Reck (born 1999), Danish footballer

See also
 Wreck (disambiguation)